Hyderabad–Vasco da Gama Express is an express train service connecting Hyderabad in Telangana, India with Vasco da Gama, Goa, India.

Overview 

This train had its inaugural run on 29 December 2016 and regular run commenced from 5 January 2017.

Rakes 
The train has 10 coaches comprising one AC 2-tier (A1), one AC 3-tier (BV1), three Second Class sleepers (SV), three general compartments (unreserved) and two luggage rakes.

Routeing 
The 17021 / 22 Hyderabad–Vasco da Gama Express runs from Hyderabad via Mahbubnagar railway station, Kurnool City railway station, Dhone Junction railway station, Bellary Junction railway station, Hospet Junction, Gadag Junction railway station, Londa Junction, and Castle Rock, Sanverdam, Madgoan.

See also 
 Tirupati–Vasco da Gama Express
 Vasco Velankanni Express

Notes

References

External links 
 Southern Central Railway - official website

Express trains in India
Rail transport in Telangana
Rail transport in Karnataka
Rail transport in Goa
Rail transport in Andhra Pradesh
Transport in Hyderabad, India
Transport in Vasco da Gama, Goa